Nicole Melichar-Martinez and Ellen Perez defeated Anna Danilina and Aleksandra Krunić in the final, 7–5, 6–3 to win the doubles tennis title at the 2022 Tennis in the Land.

Shuko Aoyama and Ena Shibahara were the reigning champions, but Shibahara competed in Granby instead. Aoyama partnered Chan Hao-ching, but lost in the semifinals to Melichar-Martinez and Perez.

Seeds

Draw

Draw

References

External links
Main draw

Tennis in the Land - Doubles
Tennis in Cleveland